Gerald Buckley may refer to:

Gerald E. "Jerry" Buckley, journalist
Gerald Buckley (actor), see Shadow and Substance

See also
Jerry Buckley (disambiguation)